Hazlitt, Gooden & Fox, based at 38 Bury Street, London, is a firm of British art dealers, specialising in Old Master paintings and drawings.

The company was founded in 1752. In 1948, Jack Baer took over the running of the Hazlitt Gallery, and built it into "a world-class concern", and in 1973, a merger created Hazlitt Gooden & Fox, opening a New York affiliate gallery.

References

External links

Companies based in the City of Westminster
1752 establishments in England
British companies established in 1752
Retail companies established in 1752